Hind is a lunar impact crater that lies to the southeast of the walled plain Hipparchus, and due east of the crater Halley. Its diameter is 29 km. It was named after British astronomer John Russell Hind. The rim of Hind is relatively free of wear and distortion, except for a break at the north rim. The floor of Hind is relatively uneven, however, compared to the interior of Halley. Hind and the craters Hipparchus C and Hipparchus L form a line with diminishing diameters that point to the northeast.

Satellite craters

By convention these features are identified on lunar maps by placing the letter on the side of the crater midpoint that is closest to Hind.

References

External links

Hind at The Moon Wiki
  - includes Hind crater

Impact craters on the Moon